al-Karbalaei is an Arabic surname that it is used to indicate the person originates from Karbala, Iraq. Notable people with the surname include:
Basim al-Karbalaei (born 1966), Shia eulogy reciter

 Abdul Mahdi al-Karbalai, the official representative of Grand Ayatollah Sayed Ali Al-Sistani in Iraq.

Mehdi Karbalaei (born 1993), Iranian football defender

Arabic-language surnames